Ladue Horton Watkins High School is a public high school in Ladue, Missouri, United States, that is administered by the Ladue School District. Its namesake, Horton Watkins, was vice president of the International Shoe Company and died in 1949. The family of Horton Watkins donated the  tract of land on South Warson Road to the school for the high school site as a memorial.

Demographics
The racial/ethnic breakdown of the 1,271 students enrolled for the 2012–2013 school year was:

 White - 63.6%
 Black - 17.6%
 Asian/Pacific islander - 10.1%
 Hispanic - 4.5%
 Multiracial - 3.9%
 American Indian/Alaskan Native - 0.3%

The male/female ratio for 2012-13 was:
 Male - 48%
 Female - 52%

In addition, 12.2% of the students were eligible for free or reduced lunch.

Activities
For the 2011–12 school year, the school offered 26 activities approved by the Missouri State High School Activities Association (MSHSAA): baseball, boys and girls basketball, cheerleading, boys and girls cross country, dance team, field hockey, football, boys golf, girls lacrosse, orchestra, band and vocal music, scholar bowl, boys and girls soccer, girls softball, speech and debate, boys' and girls' swimming and diving, boys' and girls' tennis, boys and girls track and field, girls volleyball, water polo, and wrestling. In addition to its MSHSAA activities, the school offers students an opportunity to participate in a variety of other school-sponsored clubs.

The Ladue Rams have won several state championships:
 Scholar bowl: 2006
 Boys' golf: 1960, 1970
 Boys' swimming and diving: 1957, 1958, 1959, 1960, 1961, 1962, 1963
 Girls swimming and diving: 1976
 Boys tennis: 1962, 1985, 1995
 Girls tennis: 1978, 1988, 1989, 1990, 1991, 1992
 Boys track and field: 2003
 Girls track and field: 2005
 Boys Ice hockey: 1994, 2012 (Founder's Cup), 2021 (Wickenheiser Cup)
 Water Polo: 1973

In 2013 Ladue's Scholar Bowl team won the National Scholastics Championship.

Student activities:

 The Carnivore Club
 The Ladue Video Gaming Club: Founder - Atlee Solomon '09 
 Students Helping Children
De-Stress and Wellness Club
Student Council
 Debate
 Crescendo
Picture Perfect Photography Club
 Model UN
 Mock Trial
 Gay-Straight Alliance
 Journalism
 Science Olympiad
 DECA
 Ladue Hunger Outreach Project (HOP)
 Ladue Students Against Cancer (LSAC)
 Athletes for Athletes
 Big Brothers Big Sisters
 Blue crew
 Mu Alpha Theta (ΜΑΘ)
 Teens Against Child Trafficking
 Worldquest
 Knowledge Masters
 Teach Elders Electronics (TEE)
 Juggling Club
 Young Democrats Club
 Young Republicans Club
 Football
 Girls and boys swimming
 Water polo
 Softball
 Poms
 Wrestling
 Soccer
 Tennis
 Basketball
 Cheerleading
 Golf
 Lacrosse
 Field Hockey
 Volleyball
 Ladue Hockey
 Baseball
 Track
 Cross Country
 Strolling Strings
 Science National Honor Society (SNHS)
 Wiffle Ball
 Pep Band
 Orchestra
 Percussion Ensemble
 Student Coalition of Supporters of the USO
 Animal Rights Club
 Swimming
 Ladue Film Club
 FIRST Robotics
 The Ladudes (male a cappella)
 Viva Voce (female a cappella)

Notable alumni

 John H. "Todd" Armstrong '56 - actor, star of Jason and the Argonauts
 Paul William Bucha - '61 - Medal of Honor recipient, US Army, Captain, Vietnam
 Jehu Chesson '12 - football player for the Michigan Wolverines and the Kansas City Chiefs
Jack Fox '15 - Pro-Bowl punter for the Detroit Lions
 Frances Ginsberg '73 - opera soprano
 Duane Hawthorne '95 - football player
 Marty Hogan '76 - racquetball player
 Willy Holtzman '69 - Award-winning playwright & Screenwriter
 Karyn Kusama '86 - film director
 Dorothea Lasky '96 - poet
 Jim McKelvey '83 - co-founder of Square, Inc.
 Joel Meyers '72 - sportscaster
 Eric Nenninger '97 - actor
 Elissa L. Newport '65 - scientist
 Jean Passanante '71 - television screenwriter
 Andy Russell '59 - football player
 Becky Sauerbrunn '03 - soccer player, U.S. Women's National Team
 Jeff Smith '92 - politician
 Ben C. Solomon '06 - Pulitzer Prize-winning journalist
 Kevin Spirtas, '80 - actor
 Todd Susman ‘65 - actor
 Courtney Van Buren '98 - football player
 Justin Willman '98 - actor, magician and entertainer
 Stuart Kornfeld '54 - professor of glycobiology

References

External links
 

High schools in St. Louis County, Missouri
Educational institutions established in 1952
School buildings completed in 1952
Public high schools in Missouri
1952 establishments in Missouri
Buildings and structures in St. Louis County, Missouri